Charaxes amandae is a butterfly in the family Nymphalidae. It is found in Sudan.

Taxonomy
Junior synonym of Charaxes kirki suk

References

External links
African Butterfly Database Range map via search

Butterflies described in 1989
amandae
Endemic fauna of Sudan
Butterflies of Africa